The first season of Kud puklo da puklo premiered on 15 September 2014 and ended on 7 June 2015.

Description
This season contains 171 episode and includes Mirna Medaković, Momčilo Otašević, Milan Štrljić, Miodrag Krivokapić, Stjepan Perić, Asim Ugljen, Ecija Ojdanić, Žarko Radić, Janko Popović Volarić, Miran Kurspahić, Barbara Vicković, Suzana Nikolić, Jagoda Kumrić, Tijana Pečenčić, Sanja Vejnović, Željko Pervan, Ivan Herceg and Vesna Tominac who joined the cast. Stjepan Perić and Ivan Herceg departed the cast at the end of season.

Cast

Episodes

References 

Croatian comedy television series
2014 Croatian television seasons
2015 Croatian television seasons